Football 1 (Football until December 2013) was first specialized TV channel in Ukraine, dedicated exceptionally to football broadcasts. Football 1, Football 2 and Football 3 broadcast Ukrainian and European club competitions, international matches and other football events.

These channels belong to the Media Group Ukraine. A new channel Football 3 was launched on 1 February 2020. It ceased broadcasting on 12 July 2022, after Ukrainian oligarch Rinat Akhmetov had exited his media assets (Football 1 belongs to Media Group Ukraine holding).

Coverage

Football TV Channel is available in packages of more than 500 cable operators all over Ukraine and on the satellite television platform Viasat. Technical coverage of the TV channel in cable networks exceeds 85% according to Gfk  data.

About the channel

The channel started broadcasting on 18 November 2008.

Football TV channel is the official broadcaster of the Ukrainian Premier League. Other national leagues which are broadcast include: England, Spain, Germany, France, Brazil; as well as national cup matches of Italy and England.

Oleksandr Denisov is the director of TV-channel, commentators are: Serhiy Panasyuk (until his death in 2015), Andriy Malynovskyi, Kyrylo Krutorogov, Viktor Vatsko, Oleksandr Myhaylyuk, Andriy Stoliarchuk, Roberto Morales.

Viktor Leonenko, Serhiy Morozov, Yozhef Sabo, Viktor Hrachov, Vadym Yevtushenko, Yevhen Levchenko, Oleksandr Sopko are invited experts of the channel.

Awards
2009, 2010: The Best Sport Satellite Channel, an award of monthly Mediasat

Notes

References

External links
 /(English description)

SCM Holdings
Defunct television stations in Ukraine
Television channels and stations established in 2008
Television channels and stations disestablished in 2013
Sports television networks
Sports mass media in Ukraine
Mass media in Donetsk
Mass media in Kyiv
Association football on television
Television channels and stations disestablished in 2022
2022 disestablishments in Ukraine